The 2021–22 Texas–Rio Grande Valley Vaqueros men's basketball team represented the University of Texas Rio Grande Valley in the 2021–22 NCAA Division I men's basketball season as members of the Western Athletic Conference. The team was led by first-year head coach Matt Figger.  With the exception of two games at Bert Ogden Arena, the Vaqueros played their home games at the UTRGV Fieldhouse.  Both venues are in Edinburg, Texas.

Previous season
The Vaqueros finished the 2020–21 season 9–10, 2–5 in WAC play to finish in a tie for seventh place. In the first round of the WAC tournament, they lost to New Mexico State.

On February 6, 2021, following a game against Texas Southern, head coach Lew Hill announced that he would be stepping away to focus on his health. Unfortunately, the next day, Hill would pass away due to COVID-19. Four days later, assistant coach Jai Steadman was named interim coach for the remainder of the season.

Roster

Schedule and results 

|-
!colspan=12 style=| Exhibition

|-
!colspan=12 style=| Non-conference regular season

|-
!colspan=12 style=| WAC conference season

|-
!colspan=9 style=|WAC tournament

|-

Source

See also 
 2021–22 Texas–Rio Grande Valley Vaqueros women's basketball team

References

UT Rio Grande Valley Vaqueros men's basketball seasons
Texas–Rio Grande Valley Vaqueros
Texas–Rio Grande Valley Vaqueros men's basketball
Texas–Rio Grande Valley Vaqueros men's basketball